Juan Carlos Paredes Reasco (born 8 July 1987) is an Ecuadorian professional footballer who plays as a right-back for Cumbayá F.C..

A full international for the Ecuador national team since 2010, he has gained over 40 caps and represented the nation at the 2014 FIFA World Cup.

Club career
Paredes started playing for Huracán SC. He was sought by Guayaquil's Barcelona a year later and signed a contract with them.

He then moved on to Deportivo Cuenca and was loaned out to Rocafuerte of Ecuador's third division. He helped the team gain promotion to the second division for the 2008–09 season.

Deportivo Cuenca
Paredes returned to Deportivo Cuenca for its Copa Libertadores campaign. He has been linked for a move to Serie A. In 2010, he moved to Deportivo Quito.

Deportivo Quito
Paredes was bought off by Deportivo Quito, where he played a few Copa Libertadores games and eventually ended up becoming Champions of the Ecuadorian Serie A in 2011, defeating Emelec in Home and Away finals.

Barcelona
Paredes, having impressed with his speed and ability, signed for Guayaquil side Barcelona for the 2013 Season. Typically playing as a winger at his last club, in Barcelona he was mainly used as a right fullback which gained him experience to be Ecuador's starting fullback for numerous occasions.

Granada CF and Watford
On 16 July 2014, it was confirmed that Paredes had moved to Watford of the Championship from La Liga side Granada, with both sides owned by the same family. Paredes had only moved to Granada earlier in the summer, suggesting it was a move that was designed to benefit the English club. Subject to obtaining a work permit and gaining international clearance, he signed a five-year deal with Watford.

Olympiakos

Paredes was loaned to Greek Super League champions Olympiakos on 31 January 2017.

International career
Paredes made his International debut against Mexico on 10 September 2010, in a 2–1 away win for Ecuador, which was seen as an overdue merit as part of supporters of his former Club, Deportivo Cuenca.

He was named in Ecuador's squad for the 2014 FIFA World Cup in Brazil, and played every minute of their campaign which ended in elimination from Group E.

Career statistics

Honours
Deportivo Quito
Ecuadorian Serie A: 2011

References

1989 births
Living people
Sportspeople from Esmeraldas, Ecuador
Association football wingers
Ecuadorian footballers
Barcelona S.C. footballers
C.D. Cuenca footballers
S.D. Quito footballers
Granada CF footballers
Watford F.C. players
Olympiacos F.C. players
C.S. Emelec footballers
C.D. El Nacional footballers
Ecuadorian Serie A players
Premier League players
English Football League players
Super League Greece players
Ecuador international footballers
2014 FIFA World Cup players
2015 Copa América players
Copa América Centenario players
Ecuadorian expatriate footballers
Ecuadorian expatriate sportspeople in England
Ecuadorian expatriate sportspeople in Spain
Ecuadorian expatriate sportspeople in Greece
Expatriate footballers in Spain
Expatriate footballers in England
Expatriate footballers in Greece